Frank Hiscock may refer to:

Frank Hiscock (1834-1914), U.S. Representative and Senator from New York
Frank H. Hiscock (1856-1946), New York Chief Judge

See also
Frank Harris Hitchcock, Postmaster General of the United States